The Zhuwei Fish Harbor is a fishing port in Dayuan District, Taoyuan City, Taiwan.

History
The harbor used to be an international trading port. It was then later redeveloped into a tourist harbor.

Architecture
The harbor features fish market with 77 fish vendors and food preparation section. All of the fishing boats at the harbor are working with a one-day returning turn.

Popular culture
The harbor is one of the shooting venue for the television drama PS Man.

Transportation
The harbor is accessible by bus from Taoyuan Station of Taiwan Railways Administration.

See also
 Fisheries Agency

References

Ports and harbors of Taoyuan